Edolo is a town and comune in the province of Brescia, Lombardy, northern Italy, located in the upper Camonica valley. Edolo is neighbour to the comuni of Corteno Golgi, Incudine, Lovero, Malonno, Monno, Ponte di Legno, Saviore dell'Adamello, Sernio, Sonico, Temù, Tovo di Sant'Agata, Vezza d'Oglio and Vione.

Edolo houses the northern terminus of the Brescia-Edolo railway operated by Trenord. It is also the location of the Edolo Pumped Storage Plant.

Despite Edolo's close distance (32 km by road) to Tirano and the border with Switzerland, there is no train connection between the two towns. In the summer, a bus service connects Edolo (for trains towards Brescia) and Tirano (for the Rhaetian Railway towards the Bernina Pass).

References

Cities and towns in Lombardy